William Wing Loring (December 4, 1818 – December 30, 1886) was an American soldier who served in the armies of the United States, the Confederacy, and Egypt.

Biography

Early life
William was born in Wilmington, North Carolina, to Reuben and Hannah Loring. He was a fifth great grandson of New England pioneer Deacon Thomas Loring. When he was four, his family moved to Saint Augustine, Florida, where, at the young age of fourteen, he began a military career that spanned fifty years. As a fourteen-year-old, Loring joined the Florida Militia and gained his first combat experience fighting the Seminole Indians in minor skirmishes that would culminate in the Seminole Wars. When he was seventeen, he ran away to fight in the Texas War for Independence, but was soon retrieved by his father and taken home. For the next few years he continued to fight in the Second Seminole War and was promoted to second lieutenant. In 1837, Loring was sent to Alexandria Boarding School in Alexandria, Virginia, completing his secondary education. He attended Georgetown University from 1839 to 1840 and then went on to study law, and was admitted to the Florida bar in 1842. In 1843, he was elected to the Florida House of Representatives where he served from 1843 to 1845. In 1845 he ran unsuccessfully for the Florida Senate.

Mexican-American War
In 1846, Loring joined a newly formed regiment, the Regiment of Mounted Rifles, originally created to protect the Oregon Territory. He was promoted to major even before the regiment saw battle. Shortly thereafter the Mounted Rifles were sent to Mexico to fight in the Mexican-American war. Loring's regiment saw action in most of the battles of the war and he was wounded three times. While leading the charge into Mexico City, Loring's arm was shattered by a Mexican bullet, and he would later have it amputated. He received two brevets for bravery, one to lieutenant colonel, and another to colonel.

Antebellum years
In 1849, during the California gold rush, Loring was ordered to take command of the Oregon Territory and led a train of 600 mule teams 2,500 miles from Missouri to Oregon. He was in command of the Oregon Territory for two years and was then transferred to being commander of the forts of the frontier, such forts as Fort Ewell, Fort McIntosh, and Fort Union. During some five years he engaged in many skirmishes with the Indians, most notably with the Comanches, Apaches, and Kiowas. Loring was promoted to colonel at the age of 38 in December 1856, the youngest in the army.

He left the United States and traveled to Europe in May 1859. While there, he, like many of his fellow American officers, studied the military tactics that had been invented in the recent Crimean War. Before he returned home, Loring would visit Great Britain, France, Sweden, Prussia, Switzerland, Austria-Hungary, Italy, Russia, Turkey, and Egypt.

Civil War
When the Civil War erupted, Loring sided with the South. In a conference in New Mexico, before departing for Confederate service, Loring told his officers, "The South is my home, and I am going to throw up my commission and shall join the Southern Army, and each of you can do as you think best." He resigned from the U.S. Army on May 13, 1861. Upon offering his services to the Confederacy, Loring was promptly commissioned a brigadier general and given command of the Army of the Northwest, participating in the Western Virginia Campaign in the fall of 1861. His first assignment was to quickly collect and rally the shattered remnants of Robert S. Garnett's force following its defeat at the Battle of Rich Mountain, and drill them in preparation for the defense of western Virginia against Maj. Gen. George B. McClellan's invasion from Ohio.

After organizing an army of roughly 11,700 at Monterey, Virginia, Loring detached two brigades under Henry R. Jackson and William B. Taliaferro to the north, to fortify Frank Mountain, and defend the approach from Cheat Mountain.  Loring moved the rest of his army, the brigades of S.R. Anderson, Daniel S. Donelson, and William Gilham, south to Huntersville.  Four days after his arrival at Huntersville, Loring was joined by Colonel Robert E. Lee, who had been sent by Richmond to western Virginia with the diplomatic role of inspecting and consulting. Loring, a Mexican War veteran who outranked Lee at the time, saw Lee as Richmond's attempt to look over his shoulder, and grew resentful of his presence. Loring and Lee moved the southern portion of their army to Valley Mountain, near Mace, and down the Tygart Valley to the Battle of Cheat Mountain in September 1861. Loring soon acquired the nickname, "Old Blizzards" for his battle cry, "Give them blizzards, boys! Give them blizzards!"  Following that debacle, they moved south into Greenbrier County to reenforce the troops of the Kanawha Division under former Virginia governors John B. Floyd and Henry Alexander Wise, then-at Sewell Mountain and Meadow Bluff.  Lee was re-called back to Richmond in late October. Loring and the men remained for a short period before abandoning the mountainous region too, marching into, and down the Shenandoah Valley to join Stonewall Jackson at Winchester.

Loring famously butted heads with superior officers, particularly with Stonewall Jackson.  At the conclusion of the  Romney Expedition in northwestern Virginia (now West Virginia) in January 1862, Jackson returned to his headquarters in Winchester while assigning Loring to stay and occupy the small, mountainous town. Unhappy with their assignment of holding a remote outpost in the dead of winter, Loring and his officers went over Jackson's head to Secretary of War Judah P. Benjamin, requesting that the division be withdrawn. Jackson complied with the order, then resigned in protest of Richmond's interference with his command. He withdrew his resignation at the urging of Governor John Letcher and his commander, Joseph E. Johnston. Loring was reassigned out of Jackson's command, and given command of the Department of Southwestern Virginia.  In his five months in that role, Loring moved a force of 5,000 into the Kanawha Valley in his Kanawha Valley Campaign of 1862, ultimately occupying Charleston for a six-week period.  In mid-October, Loring was transferred to the West.

By November 1862, Loring was in Grenada, Mississippi, commanding a division in John C. Pemberton's Department of Mississippi and East Louisiana, another superior officer he had friction with.  In early spring of 1863, he defended against the Yazoo Pass Expedition, before his division was ordered south to re-enforce Vicksburg.  He was present at Pemberton's disastrous defeat at Champion Hill. Cut off from the rest of the army, most of his division then marched east to Jackson, Mississippi to join forces with Gen. Joseph E. Johnston for the impending siege. By the end of 1863, he was under the command of Lt. Gen. Leonidas Polk and defended east Mississippi from William T. Sherman during the Meridian Campaign of February 1864.  Polk's relatively small force was then ordered to northwest Georgia to join Joe Johnston's Army of Tennessee, which was beginning to abandon its winter quarters in Dalton, Georgia to start the Atlanta Campaign.  Polk's divisions, one commanded by Loring, arrived just in time to temporarily thwart a flanking maneuver by Union General James B. McPherson at the Battle of Resaca. Facing overwhelming numbers, Johnston's army was continuously flanked and forced to withdraw closer and closer to Atlanta.

Loring temporarily took command of Polk's III corps when Polk was nearly cut in two by an artillery round and killed at Pine Mountain on June 14, 1864.  He led the corps during the Battle of Kennesaw Mountain but was soon replaced on July 7, 1864, by Lt. Gen. Alexander P. Stewart. Loring returned to divisional command, fighting at the Battle of Peachtree Creek, and at Ezra Church, where he was wounded.  Loring was out of action until after the fall of Atlanta. Upon returning he commanded his division in Stewart's corps of army now commanded by John Bell Hood, seeing combat at the Franklin on November 30, 1864, and Nashville in mid-December. In the last year of the war, the remnants of Hood's smashed forces returned east to participate in the Carolinas Campaign, seeing action at the Battle of Bentonville before being surrendered by Johnston at Durham, North Carolina a month later.

Egypt

After the Confederate defeat in the Civil War, Loring served for nine years in the army of Isma'il Pasha, the Khedive of Egypt. He joined about fifty Union and Confederate veterans who had been recommended to the Khedive by William Tecumseh Sherman. Loring began as Inspector General of the army, a position in which he suggested various ways to modernize the army. He was then placed in charge of the country's coastal defenses, where he oversaw the erection of numerous fortifications. In 1875, he was promised the command of an Egyptian invasion of Abyssinia, however Ratib Pasha was given the assignment instead, and Loring was named chief of staff. Ratib Pasha was the ex-slave of the late Said Pawshar, the viceroy of Egypt, with negligible military qualifications; according to one of Loring's American compatriots, the freedman was "shrivelled with lechery as the mummy is with age." The Egyptian-Ethiopian War ended in disaster at the Battle of Gura, and the Egyptians blamed the Americans for the disaster. When Ratib Pasha had urged remaining with the Gura fortress, Loring had taunted him and called him a coward until he consented to meeting the Ethiopian host in the open valley. While the rest of the Egyptian army returned home, they were ordered to remain in Massawa until further notice, where they endured the summer months, then spent the next two years enduring endless frustration and humiliation in Cairo. In 1878, partially due to finances, the American officers were dismissed. During his service to Egypt, Loring attained the rank of Fereek Pasha (Major General). After his return to the United States, he wrote a book about his Egyptian experiences, entitled A Confederate Soldier in Egypt (1884). Loring was also the posthumous co-author of The March of the Mounted Riflemen (1940).

Return to United States
Loring returned to Florida where he unsuccessfully ran for the United States Senate against Charles W. Jones. He then moved to New York City, where he died. He was buried in Loring Park, behind Government House in downtown St. Augustine, Florida until August 24, 2020, when the University of Florida Historic St. Augustine exhumed his ashes and began the process of moving them to Craig Funeral Home Memorial Park.

Legacy and honors
 During World War II the Liberty ship  was built in Panama City, Florida, and named in his honor.
 A memorial to him in St. Augustine, Florida, was removed in August 2020 at the request of his descendents.

See also

List of American Civil War generals (Confederate)

Notes

References
 Eicher, John H., and David J. Eicher, Civil War High Commands. Stanford: Stanford University Press, 2001. .
 Sifakis, Stewart. Who Was Who in the Civil War. New York: Facts On File, 1988. .
 Warner, Ezra J. Generals in Gray: Lives of the Confederate Commanders. Baton Rouge: Louisiana State University Press, 1959. .
A Confederate Soldier in Egypt
Loring website
Loring biography at Civil War Home
Biography of the Day: General William Wing Loring C.S.A.

External links
 

1818 births
1886 deaths
People from Wilmington, North Carolina
Members of the Florida House of Representatives
Confederate States Army major generals
American people of the Seminole Wars
People of the Texas Revolution
American military personnel of the Mexican–American War
Members of the Aztec Club of 1847
People of North Carolina in the American Civil War
People from St. Augustine, Florida
Georgetown University alumni
Florida lawyers
American people in the khedivial Egyptian Army
American amputees
Writers from Florida
Writers from North Carolina
19th-century American politicians
Philodemic Society members
19th-century American lawyers